Ernesto Panza (23 May 1878 – 27 April 1949) was an Italian sports shooter. He competed in the 50 m rifle event at the 1924 Summer Olympics.

References

External links
 

1878 births
1949 deaths
Italian male sport shooters
Olympic shooters of Italy
Shooters at the 1924 Summer Olympics
Sportspeople from Milan